Z28 may refer to:

 German destroyer Z28, one of fifteen Type 1936A destroyers built for the Kriegsmarine
 New South Wales Z28 class locomotive, an amalgamation under one class of two former classes
 Z28, a model of the mid-size American automobile Chevrolet Camaro
 "Z28", a song from the 2009 Static-X album Cult of Static